The women's 1000 metres races of the 2013–14 ISU Speed Skating World Cup 6, arranged in the Thialf arena, in Heerenveen, Netherlands, was held on 16 March 2014.

Ireen Wüst, Margot Boer and Lotte van Beek made it an all-Dutch podium, placing first, second and third, respectively.

Result
The race took place on Sunday, 16 March, scheduled at 17:12.

Division A

References

Women 1000
6